The Suffolk Police and Crime Commissioner is the police and crime commissioner, an elected official tasked with setting out the way crime is tackled by Suffolk Police in the English County of Suffolk. The post was created in November 2012, following an election held on 15 November 2012, and replaced the Suffolk Police Authority. The current incumbent is Tim Passmore, who represents the Conservative Party.

List of Suffolk Police and Crime Commissioners

References

Police and crime commissioners in England